Gahama is a village in the Commune of Bururi in Bururi Province in southern Burundi. It is located southeast of Bururi and its western side is framed by a forest.

References

External links
Satellite map at Maplandia.com

Populated places in Bururi Province